Toafitu Perive (born 7 January 1985) is a Samoan weightlifter competing in the 77 kg category. He competed at the 2012 Summer Olympics finishing in eleventh place.

Medalbox note

References

External links

Samoan male weightlifters
1985 births
Living people
Weightlifters at the 2012 Summer Olympics
Olympic weightlifters of Samoa

Weightlifters at the 2014 Commonwealth Games
Commonwealth Games competitors for Samoa